Why Did I Get Married? is a 2007 American comedy-drama film adaptation written, produced, directed, and starring Tyler Perry. It was inspired by Perry's play of the same name. The film also stars Janet Jackson, Jill Scott, Malik Yoba, Sharon Leal, Tasha Smith, Michael Jai White, Richard T. Jones, Denise Boutte, and Keesha Sharp. The film was released in the United States by Lionsgate on October 12, 2007.

The film is about the difficulty of maintaining a solid relationship in modern times.

Plot

Four couples, who are also best friends since college, converge in a house in the mountains for a week-long retreat. This ritual of sorts aims to help them work out their marital problems and ask the question "Why did I get married?". Though the couples have committed to being physically present for the week, some of them have not been emotionally present in their respective marriages for quite some time. The week is not planned out in a well-programmed sequence, so the events unfold somewhat spontaneously, beginning with their "adventures" in getting up to the mountain retreat.

 The first couple, attorney Dianne (Leal) and pediatrician Terry (Perry), drive up together and argue most of the way because Dianne refuses to stop working. She takes calls on her phone instead of talking with Terry.
 The second couple, hair salon owner Angela (Smith) and former pro football player Marcus (White), take the train. Angela constantly argues with Marcus and anyone who dares to interrupt them.
 The third couple is housewife Sheila (Scott) and entrepreneur Mike (Jones). Sheila has to get off the plane because of her weight and the requirement to purchase two seats so she drives the long distance in the snow, while Mike continues flirting on the flight with Sheila's single friend, Trina (Boutte).
 The fourth couple, psychologist Patricia (Jackson) and architect Gavin (Yoba), arrive by limo cab. Their journey is not documented. However, right before they leave to go to the retreat, Gavin shows up to pick up Patricia at a lecture she was giving (she is the author of a book called "Why Did I Get Married?") and artlessly dodges a question about their own marriage.

Dianne falls asleep not long after arriving with her BlackBerry close by hand. When her secretary calls while she is asleep, Terry tells her not to call them while they are on their vacation. When Patricia arrives, she goes up to wake Dianne while the men bond over the wine that Terry has poured for his wife. The sound of arguing signals the arrival of Angela and Marcus. When Mike arrives without Sheila, the other wives berate him and Trina for having left Shelia to drive alone. Mike shows complete disregard for his wife and disparages her weight. Her friends try to reach Sheila by phone but get her voice mail only.

Sheila is persistent to get to the retreat because she wants to make her marriage work. Providence leads her to Sheriff Troy Jackson (Rucker)'s office. Due to the weather, the roads have been closed for the night and she has no choice but to spend the night in the office. That same night, Mike is caught by Angela going to Trina's bedroom. Sheila arrives at the retreat house the following morning with Troy in tow. She introduces Troy to the others and tells them she has invited him to breakfast. Troy becomes a threat to Mike, not because of Sheila, but because of Trina. Breakfast is a noisy affair with the arguing couples and Angela insulting Trina, whom she instantly disliked.

Throughout the few days spent on retreat, there are spontaneous revelations. The infidelity of Marcus and Mike leads to a discussion by the men of the 80/20 rule. According to this rule, most men get 80% of what they need from a marriage, yet they tend to go after the 20% that someone outside can provide for them because it appears to be more to them when it really isn't.

During a heated argument at dinner, Angela exposes Mike and Trina's affair. In turn, Mike reveals the other couples' hidden secrets: Marcus had contracted VD after he cheated on Angela, Dianne had her tubes tied after her daughter was born without Terry's knowledge and withheld disclosing her disinterest in having another baby, Terry had gotten a DNA test on him and Diane’s daughter because he was unsure he was the father ,and Gavin had criticized Patricia for not protecting their young son in a fatal car accident a year prior. Angela admits giving Marcus the STD from her own cheating. Enraged, he tries choking her while the others pull him away. Mike then tells Sheila he wants a divorce, and she smashes a wine bottle over his head, knocking him out.

All the couples suddenly decide they can't stay in the house any longer. Sheila checks into a local hotel to recover from her divorce and that Mike had drained her bank account. She is in a depression when Troy goes to visit her. He takes her up to a mountain where she cries and mourns the loss of her love and the only life she knew.

The other couples head back home. Patricia and Gavin are barely speaking to each other after the revelation of the latter calling the former "stupid" for not protecting their son during the time of the accident. Eventually, she breaks down emotionally and confesses that she was only trying to be perfect. They both agree to face the situation and soon reconcile. Angela and Marcus are still fighting, especially when Marcus' ex-girlfriend and baby mama, Keisha (Whitehead), shows up at Angela's salon, and disrespects her. This happens again when the couple arrives at her house for the kids. Marcus finally stands up to both women and frightens Angela into realizing she is wrecking their life with her constant arguing by disappearing for a few days. On Terry's birthday at their home, Dianne accuses Terry of wanting her to be a housewife, while he calls her out for neglecting him and their daughter. He moves out as he feels Dianne constantly prioritizes her career over them. Patricia meets up with Dianne and Angela, moping over their husbands, and gives them good counseling about the need to get back on track: making a list of both the good and bad things their husbands have done.

In the mountains, Sheila settles into a new life at her new job at the general store owned by Troy's father. The two bond while she gradually realizes her self-worth. Angela cooks dinner for Marcus after finishing with her list. Although he suspects she is trying to poison him at first, they reunite and set new conditions. Dianne goes to see Terry and begs him to come back home after crying over her list. He plays with her head a little to get back at her, but they eventually reconcile as well.

Some time later, the couples converge at a gala celebration for an award recently received by Patricia. She, Dianne, and Angela are elated when Sheila arrives, re-introduces Troy as her new husband, and has successfully lost weight with his help. Troy meets up with the husbands, who are also gladly surprised by the news of his and Sheila's marriage. Although Mike's still with Trina, he tries to weasel his way back into his ex-wife's good graces, but she turns him down, telling him to go enjoy Trina. Patricia encloses a confession of her love for Gavin and a message of loving, respecting, and trusting God in her acceptance speech.

Cast
 Tyler Perry as Dr. Terry Bob, a pediatrician 
 Sharon Leal as Dianne Bob, an attorney
 Malik Yoba as Gavin Agnew, an architect
 Janet Jackson as Dr. Patricia Agnew, a psychologist 
 Michael Jai White as Marcus Williams, a former professional football player
 Tasha Smith as Angela Williams, a hair salon owner 
 Richard T. Jones as Mike, an entrepreneur
 Jill Scott as Sheila Jackson, a housewife
 Lamman Rucker as Troy Jackson, the local sheriff
 Denise Boutte as Trina
 Keesha Sharp as Pam
 Kaira Whitehead as Keisha

Locations
The film was shot in the state of Georgia and the province of British Columbia in Canada. In Georgia, scenes were shot in Decatur at Agnes Scott College along with parts spent in Atlanta. In Canada, scenes were shot in the city of Vancouver, Pemberton and Whistler.

Production and development

Perry decided to take out many of the church and message scenes because he wanted the film to be "on a whole 'nother spiritual level--there's a whole 'nother connection to it." He said his writing has improved since the play.

Perry invited experienced and neophyte African-American actors to a reading of an early script in order to field reactions, including Danny! and Tracee Ellis Ross.

Reception

Critical response
Review aggregation website Rotten Tomatoes gives the film a score of 48% based on 42 reviews, with an average rating of 5.50/10. The website's critics consensus reads: "Despite some poignant observations on modern marriages, Why Did I Get Married? is too preachy and melodramatic." On Metacritic, the film had an average score of 54/100 based on reviews from 12 critics. CinemaScore polls reported that the average grade moviegoers gave the film was an "A+" on an A+ to F scale.

Paul Grenada said that while "there are times where the script seems stiff,...[the film] teaches without hammering, and you leave the movie feeling good about what you saw." Giving the movie a B−, Entertainment Weekly said that Perry is of the "spell-everything-in-capital-letters and act-it-out-loudly schools," but added that "one performance glistens--Jill Scott's as the sad, heavyset Sheila, who locates the faith that's the source of love."  Time magazine gave the film a B and called it the "usual artless mix of broad comedy, teary confessions and spiritual uplift."

Box office
In its opening weekend, the film grossed $21.4 million in 3,105 theaters in the United States and Canada, ranking #1 at the box office. In its second weekend, the film slipped to #2 in the box office charts, with a gross of $12.1 million, bringing the 10-day total to over $38 million. In total, the film domestically grossed $55,862,886.

Soundtrack
The soundtrack was released by Atlantic Records on October 2, 2007. Neither Janet Jackson nor Jill Scott are featured on the soundtrack. The soundtrack debuted at number 51 on Billboard 200, number seven on R&B/Hip-Hop Albums and number six on Soundtracks with 58,000 copies sold in first week.

 Keith Sweat feat. Keyshia Cole - "Love U Better"
 Babyface - "Sorry for the Stupid Things"
 Anita Baker - "You Belong to Me"
 Kelly Price - "Why"
 Gerald Levert feat. Jaheim - "DJ Don't Remix"
 Musiq Soulchild - "Betterman"
 Tyrese Gibson - "One"
 Hope - "Who Am I To Say"
 Beyoncé - "Flaws And All"
 Laura Izibor - "Mmm..."
 Amel Larrieux - "No One Else"
 Tamika Scott - "Why Did I Get Married"
 Michael Bublé - "L-O-V-E"
 Jennifer Holliday - "Givin' Up"

Home media
The film was released on DVD on February 12, 2008. The DVD includes subtitles in English and Spanish, as well as bloopers.

A Blu-ray was released on November 23, 2010.

Awards and nominations
 Image Awards
 Outstanding Motion Picture (Nominated)
 Outstanding Actress in a Motion Picture: Jill Scott (Nominated)
 Outstanding Supporting Actor in a Motion Picture: Tyler Perry (Nominated)
 Outstanding Supporting Actress in a Motion Picture: Janet Jackson (Winner)

Sequel
A sequel, titled Why Did I Get Married Too? starring Perry and the original cast, was released on April 2, 2010.

Subsequently, Perry created a comedy-drama television series based upon the two films titled Tyler Perry's For Better or Worse. The series, which stars White and Smith as Marcus and Angela, premiered on TBS on November 25, 2011. In June 2021, Perry entertained the idea of revisiting the franchise with a film called Why Did I Get Married Again.

References

External links

 
 
 
 
 
 

2007 films
2007 comedy-drama films
American LGBT-related films
Films directed by Tyler Perry
African-American comedy-drama films
African-American LGBT-related films
African-American films
Films about race and ethnicity
Films scored by Aaron Zigman
Films set in Colorado
Films shot in Atlanta
Films shot in British Columbia
Lionsgate films
Films with screenplays by Tyler Perry
2007 comedy films
2007 drama films
2000s English-language films
2000s American films